Dhruba Chand Halder College is an undergraduate degree college of Dakshin Barasat in Jaynagar of South 24 Parganas district in the Indian State of West Bengal. It is affiliated with the University of Calcutta. The college had been accredited with a B+ grade by the National Assessment and Accreditation Council (NAAC), under UGC, MHRD, Govt. of India.

Departments

Science

Chemistry
Physics
Mathematics
Botany
Zoology
Microbiology
Computer Science

Arts

Bengali
English
Sanskrit
History
Geography
Political Science
Philosophy
Economics
Education
Modern Computer Application

Commerce

Commerce

Accreditation
Dhruba Chand Halder College is recognized by the University Grants Commission (UGC).

See also 
List of colleges affiliated to the University of Calcutta
Education in India
Education in West Bengal

References

External links
Dhruba Chand Halder College

Educational institutions established in 1965
University of Calcutta affiliates
Universities and colleges in South 24 Parganas district
1965 establishments in West Bengal
Education in Jaynagar Majilpur